Wurno is a Local Government Area in Sokoto State, Nigeria. Its headquarters is in the town of Wurno, near the Gagere River.

It has an area of 685 km and a population of 162,307 at the 2006 census.

The postal code of the area is 842.

References

Local Government Areas in Sokoto State